The National Association of Youth Hostel Wardens was a trade union representing workers at youth hostels in England and Wales.

The union was founded in 1948 as the National Federation of Wardens' Associations.  In 1965, it became the "National Association of Youth Hostel Wardens".  Never a large organisation, in the late 1970s its membership was around 300, with the highest membership levels in the Lake District, Devon and Cornwall.

The union merged with the Transport and General Workers' Union in 1978.

See also

 List of trade unions
 Transport and General Workers' Union
 TGWU amalgamations

References

Arthur Ivor Marsh, Victoria Ryan. Historical Directory of Trade Unions, Volume 5 Ashgate Publishing, Ltd., Jan 1, 2006 pg. 437

Defunct trade unions of the United Kingdom
Hospitality industry trade unions
Transport and General Workers' Union amalgamations
Trade unions disestablished in 1978